Ashley Jensen (born 11 August 1969) is a Scottish actress and narrator. She was nominated for an Emmy for her role on the television series Extras, in which she appeared from 2005 to 2007. She was a cast member of the ABC series Ugly Betty and the short-lived CBS sitcom Accidentally on Purpose. She also plays the main character in the comedy-drama detective television series Agatha Raisin.

Career
Jensen trained in Drama at Queen Margaret University in Edinburgh. 

Her first significant television role was as Clare Donnelly, daughter of Glasgow criminal Jo-Jo Donnelly (played by Billy Connolly) in the 1993 BBC drama Down Among the Big Boys. In 1994, she played eccentric secretary Rosie McConnichy in the final series of BBC comedy May to December, as a replacement for the character of secretary Hilary (Rebecca Lacey), and Heather in Roughnecks, a BBC television series about workers on a North Sea oil platform. Jensen had a small role in a Dangerfield episode "Contact" as the mother of a young girl with meningitis. She then appeared as Fiona Morris in EastEnders. She also appeared in the 2003 BBC drama Two Thousand Acres of Sky.

Jensen co-starred alongside Ricky Gervais in the BBC Two/HBO television programme Extras as the socially inept Maggie Jacobs. For her work on the first series, she received best television comedy actress and newcomer awards at the 2005 British Comedy Awards. In 2006, Jensen received two British Comedy Awards and a BAFTA nomination for her role in Extras. Her role in the 2007 Christmas Special earned her an Emmy Award nomination. In January 2006 she starred in the short-lived drama series Eleventh Hour on ITV. Later that year she played Steve Coogan's agent in A Cock and Bull Story. In 2007, she provided the narration for the film Taking Liberties.

In September 2006, Jensen's first major role on American television came when she took the role of regular character Christina McKinney on the ABC series Ugly Betty. Her character was originally an American, but when she met with the show's producers they liked Jensen's accent and changed the nationality of the character, keeping McKinney Scottish. Production of Ugly Betty moved to New York from Los Angeles in mid-2008, causing a conflict for Jensen, who was unable to relocate from Los Angeles and left the show in 2009 near the end of the third season but made a return guest appearance in 2010 during the fourth season.

In January 2009, Jensen starred in No Holds Bard, a BBC Scotland one-off special comedy shown on Burns Night as part of a line-up of special programming to mark the 250th birthday of Robert Burns. She is the narrator of Channel 4's Embarrassing Illnesses and Embarrassing Bodies. She also narrated an advertising campaign for Bank of Scotland and Persil detergent adverts for both television and radio. From September 2009 to May 2010, she appeared in the sitcom Accidentally on Purpose as Olivia. Jensen starred in the 2009 BBC comedy Nativity! as Jennifer Lore, a Hollywood producer's secretary and the love interest of Paul Maddens, played by Martin Freeman.

On 21 December 2010, she starred in the one-off/pilot BBC comedy drama Accidental Farmer, playing a London executive who buys a derelict farm with her philandering boyfriend's credit card. In 2011, she voiced Nanette the frog in the animated production Gnomeo & Juliet. She starred in the ITV drama The Reckoning in April of that year. In October 2012, she appeared as a guest on the BBC cookery programme Saturday Kitchen.

In 2014, she played the eponymous lead character in the television film adaptation of the M. C. Beaton novel Agatha Raisin and the Quiche of Death for Sky1. She also starred in the eight-part series that first aired on Sky1 on 7 June 2016.

From 2015 to 2019, Jensen acted in Catastrophe, a comedy series for Channel 4, and with Susan Calman in Calman's BBC Radio 4 comedy series Sisters.

In 2017, she starred in a six-part TV series for BBC TV, Love, Lies & Records, depicting the gritty life and entwined storylines working in Leeds Registry Office. In March 2019, Jensen reunited with Gervais in the Netflix black comedy series After Life, a role she continued for all three series. In April 2019 she played Debbie Dorell in the second series of BBC TV drama Trust Me. When an injured soldier discovers patients in his hospital ward dying, he attempts to investigate the suspicious deaths. Also in 2019, she played the voice of Jacqueline in Lady and the Tramp.

In November 2022 she was announced as the new lead in the BBC drama Shetland.

Personal life
Jensen has one son from her marriage to actor Terence Beesley, whom she met in 1999 while working on a stage production of King Lear. Her husband died in November 2017 and an inquest later found he had taken his own life.

Filmography

References

External links

1969 births
Living people
Alumni of Queen Margaret University
People educated at Annan Academy
People from Annan, Dumfries and Galloway
Scottish film actresses
Scottish radio actresses
Scottish soap opera actresses
Scottish television actresses
Scottish stage actresses
Scottish voice actresses
Scottish expatriates in the United States
20th-century Scottish actresses
21st-century Scottish actresses
National Youth Theatre members
Scottish Shakespearean actresses